King's School Canterbury Boat Club is a rowing club based at Brett Sturry Quarry, Westbere Lakes, Sturry, Canterbury, Kent.

History
The Club also has a boathouse at Plucks Gutter on the River Stour and is owned by The King's School, Canterbury with rowing being a major school sport.

The club is very successful and has produced multiple British champions.

Honours

Schools' Head of the River Race

British champions

Key
 J junior
 2, 4, 8 crew size
 18, 16, 15, 14 age group
 x sculls
 - coxless
 + coxed

References

Sport in Kent
Sport in Canterbury
Rowing clubs in England
Scholastic rowing in the United Kingdom